5-I-R91150 (or R93274) is a compound that acts as a potent and selective antagonist of 5-HT2A receptors. Its main application is as its iodine-123 radiolabeled form, in which it can be used in SPECT scanning in human neuroimaging studies, to examine the distribution of the 5-HT2A receptor subtype in the brain, e.g. with respect to sex and age and in adults with Asperger syndrome or Alzheimer's disease.

An alternative 5-HT2A receptor ligand also used in neuroimaging is altanserin.

References

Further reading 

 
 

5-HT2A antagonists
Fluoroarenes
Piperidines
Iodoarenes
Salicylamide ethers